The Sula cicadabird (Edolisoma sula), also known as the Sula cuckooshrike or Moluccan graybird, is a species of bird in the family Campephagidae.
It is endemic to Indonesia.

Its natural habitats are subtropical or tropical moist lowland forest and subtropical or tropical moist montane forest.

References

Sula cicadabird
Birds of the Sula Islands
Sula cicadabird
Taxonomy articles created by Polbot